Šakiai is a city in the Marijampolė County, Lithuania. It is presumed that Šakiai first expanded from Šakaičai village. By 1719 a church in Šakiai was built. By the 19th century Šakiai already had city rights; it also had a school, Catholic and Lutheran churches, a synagogue, and a post office. During World War II the city was destroyed by the German army.

History
Šakiai is the birthplace of early Zionist philanthropist Isaac Leib Goldberg in 1860.

Several massacres of Jewish people are alleged to have taken place in Šakiai in World War II, from July to September 1941. The killings are alleged to have committed by an Einsatzgruppen of German SS troops. The involvement of a small number of Lithuanians is also alleged.

Gallery

Notable residents
 Zygmunt Kęstowicz (1921–2007), Polish actor
 Gvidonas Markevičius (born 1969), basketball player
 Dainius Adomaitis (born 1974), basketball player and coach

Twin towns – sister cities

Šakiai is twinned with:
 Gołdap, Poland

References

 
Cities in Lithuania
Cities in Marijampolė County
Municipalities administrative centres of Lithuania
Suwałki Governorate
Holocaust locations in Lithuania